The Persian damselfly or Dumont's bluetail (Ischnura intermedia) is a damselfly, belonging to the family Coenagrionidae.

Distribution
It was first described in Anatolia, Turkey in 1974 and has been reported from Syria, Iraq, Iran and Turkmenistan. It was discovered in Europe on the island of Cyprus in 2013 and has been recorded at 12 localities in the South West. Globally it is classified as Near-threatened. It has not been evaluated for its conservation status in Europe, but is likely to be Endangered.

Habitat
Permanent slow-flowing streams and channels with localized patches of reeds or other marshy vegetation

Description
Adult males are similar in size and appearance to I. elegans. Persian blue damselflies have a head and thorax patterned with blue and black. Both sexes have two-toned diamond-shaped pterostigma (wing spots) on the wings which are shorter than I. elegans. The wing spots are smaller on the hindwings. Eyes are blue. Males have a largely black abdomen with very narrow pale markings where each segment joins the next. Segment eight (S8) is entirely pale blue and S9, which is black on I. elegans, is also blue. There is a seasonal variation in the black and blue patterns on S8 and S9.
Immature females in the aurantiaca phase have extensive orange colouration on the head, thorax, and the underside of the abdomen. On maturity, the orange colour changes to yellow or green.

Behavior and flight season
I. intermedia is not an active flyer and adults typically rest 10–30 cm above the water. The flight season on Cyprus is from late March till mid-November.

References

 Askew, R.R. (2004) The Dragonflies of Europe. (revised ed.) Harley Books. p215. 
 Boudot JP., et al. (2009) Atlas of the Odonata of the Mediterranean and North Africa. Libellula Supplement 9:1-256.
 Dijkstra, K-D.B & Lewington, R. (2006) Field Guide to the Dragonflies of Britain and Europe. British Wildlife Publishing. 
 Smallshire, Dave & Swash, Andy (2020) Europe’s Dragonflies. Princeton University Press 
 Sparrow, David J; Sparrow, Rosalyn & De Knijf, Geert, in: Sparrow, David J. and John, Eddie (Eds.) (2016) An Introduction to the Wildlife of Cyprus. Terra Cypria.

External links
 
 

Ischnura
Damselflies of Europe
Insects described in 1974